Milton Keynes bus station may refer to one of a number of possible topics:
 The former Milton Keynes central bus station, which is no longer in use.
 The travel interchange outside Milton Keynes Central railway station, which has taken over the functions of the former bus station.
 Milton Keynes Coachway (beside M1J14), used by National Express north/south services and Stagecoach east/west services.

See also
 Bus services in Milton Keynes